Idol: Jakten på en superstjerne 2006 was the fourth season of Idol Norway based on the British singing competition Pop Idol. It premiered one year after the third season and was aired in the first half of 2006.
Kåre Magnus Bergh remained as the co-host of Solveig Kloppen who was pregnant during the show. Between March 3 and April 27 she was replaced by the following (in order of appearance): Berte Rommetveit, Guri Solberg, Sandra Lyng Haugen, Marion Ravn and Silje Stang who each hosted one show next to Bergh. Tone-Lise Skagefoss and Tor Milde remained as judges and were joined by Amund Bjørklund and Hans Olav Grøttheim. 
Aleksander Denstad With auditioned with his girlfriend Vivian Sørmeland. The two of them were lead singers of the unsigned project WimpyLine. Both managed to advance through the semifinals to the top 12 and while Sørmeland placed third her boyfriend Width went on winning the entire show making him the youngest winner of the show (he was 18 at that time). Peaking at no. 4 in Norway, first album coming home also managed to become a success in Japan.

Finals

Finalists
(ages stated at time of contest)

Elimination Chart

Notes:
Because Iselin withdrew after the second liveshow Siri Helene returned as her replacement after Audun (who was voted off the latest at that point) declined.

Live show details

Heat 1 (8 February 2006)

Notes
Jonas Thomassen and Anders Mjaaland advanced to the top 12 of the competition. The other 6 contestants were eliminated.
Maria Holand Tøsse and Yolanda Myrbostad returned for a second chance at the top 12 in the Wildcard Round.

Heat 2 (10 February 2006)

Notes
Ørjan Hatlevik and Vivian Sørmeland advanced to the top 12 of the competition. The other 6 contestants were eliminated.
Quang Tran Trung and Mari Steinnes returned for a second chance at the top 12 in the Wildcard Round.

Heat 3 (16 February 2006)

Notes
Iselin Andresen and Siri Helene Erland advanced to the top 12 of the competition. The other 6 contestants were eliminated.
Melanie Helmichsen and Marita Johansen returned for a second chance at the top 12 in the Wildcard Round.

Heat 4 (18 February 2006)

Notes
Oda Evjen Gjøvåg and Stine Hansen advanced to the top 12 of the competition. The other 6 contestants were eliminated.
Audun Rensel returned for a second chance at the top 12 in the Wildcard Round.

Heat 5 (22 February 2006)

Notes
Aleksander Denstad With and Wisnu Witono Adhi advanced to the top 12 of the competition. The other 6 contestants were eliminated.
Cindy Selven Røe returned for a second chance at the top 12 in the Wildcard Round.

Wildcard round (24 February 2006)

Notes
Marita Johansen and Audun Rensel received the highest number of votes, and completed the top 12.

Live Show 1 (3 March 2006)
Theme: Your Idol

Live Show 2 (10 March 2006)
Theme: Movie Songs

Live Show 3 (17 March 2006)
Theme: Disco

Live Show 4 (31 March 2006)
Theme: Made in Norway

Live Show 5 (7 April 2006)
Theme: Unplugged

Live Show 6 (14 April 2006)
Theme: 1980s

Live Show 7 (21 April 2006)
Theme: Made in Sweden

Live Show 8 (28 April 2006)
Theme: Big Band

Live Show 9 (5 May 2006)
Theme: Duets

Live Show 10: Semi-final (12 May 2006)
Theme: Judge's Choice

Live final (19 May 2006)

References

External links
Profiles of the top 12 finalists

Season 04
2006 Norwegian television seasons